Seredyna-Buda is a city in Shostka Raion of Sumy Oblast of northeastern Ukraine. It was the administrative center of Seredyna-Buda Raion until it was abolished on 18 July 2020. It is located on Bryansk to Konotop branch line and is served by the railway station Zernove. Seredyna-Buda was founded in the 17th century by Old Believers migrated from Russia. It has had town status since 1964. Population:  In 2001, population was 7,500.

References

Cities in Sumy Oblast
Novgorod-Seversky Uyezd
Populated places established in the 17th century
17th-century establishments in Ukraine